The 1984–85 season was Manchester City's 83rd season of competitive football and 19th season in the second division of English football. In addition to the First Division, the club competed in the FA Cup and Football League Cup. The club was promoted to the First Division at the end of the season.

Second Division

League table

Results summary

Results by matchday

FA Cup

EFL Cup

References

External links

Manchester City F.C. seasons
Manchester City
Articles which contain graphical timelines